Executive Schedule is the system of salaries given to the highest-ranked appointed officials in the executive branch of the U.S. government. The president of the United States appoints individuals to these positions, most with the advice and consent of the United States Senate. They include members of the president's Cabinet, several top-ranking officials of each executive department, the directors of some of the more prominent departmental and independent agencies, and several members of the Executive Office of the President.

There are five pay rates within the Executive Schedule, denoted with a Roman numeral with I being the highest level and V the lowest. Federal law lists the positions eligible for the Executive Schedule and the corresponding level. The law also gives the president the ability to grant Executive Schedule IV and V status to no more than 34 employees not listed.

Certain job titles tend to be placed at certain levels of the Executive Schedule.  For example, in the executive departments, secretaries are on Level I; deputy secretaries are on Level II; under secretaries are mostly on Level III; and assistant secretaries, general counsels, inspectors general, chief financial officers, and chief information officers are mostly on Level IV.  The directors of departmental and independent agencies vary widely in their placement, and are represented in every level from I to V, with their subordinates being placed on levels below them.  A few agencies have general counsels, inspectors general, chief financial officers, or chief information officers on Level IV along with their departmental counterparts, although agency officials with these titles may instead be on another pay scale such as the Senior Executive Service.

Calculation of pay rate

Many political appointees have had their pay rate frozen at lower levels. If this amount is found to be midway between multiples of $100, then it will be rounded to the next highest multiple of $100.

Section 738 of division E of the Consolidated Appropriations Act, 2018 (Public Law 115-141, March 23, 2018), continued the freeze on the payable pay rates for certain senior political officials at 2013 levels through January 5, 2019. The failure to enact new appropriations legislation may allow the freeze to expire. However, the officially established and posted pay rates (or pay ranges) for 2018 are in effect and used for determining pay for other employees. For more information, please see Compensation Policy Memorandum 2018-08 at https://chcoc.gov/content/continued-pay-freeze-certain-senior-political-officials-2.

Executive Schedule rates indirectly affect the rates of pay for other pay scales such as the General Schedule, Senior Executive Service, Senior Level, Senior Foreign Service, and other federal civilian pay systems, as well as the pay of uniformed military personnel, because various federal laws establishing those pay systems normally tie the maximum amount payable to various levels of the Executive Schedule.  For example, no one paid on the General Schedule may earn more than the rate for Level IV of the Executive Schedule.  Because of these pay caps and freezes to the Executive Schedule, federal workers at the top of their pay bands are often unable to receive pay increases, resulting in salary compression.

Level I
 lists the positions that receive the amount of pay determined by Chapter 11 of Title 2.  Since January 2022, the annual rate of pay for Level I is $226,300. There exist 21 positions, which are as follows:

Department secretaries 
Secretary of State
Secretary of the Treasury
Secretary of Defense
Attorney General
Secretary of the Interior
Secretary of Homeland Security
Secretary of Commerce
Secretary of Housing and Urban Development
Secretary of Energy
Secretary of Education
Secretary of Veterans Affairs
Secretary of Health and Human Services
Secretary of Agriculture
Secretary of Labor
Secretary of Transportation

Executive Office of the President 
United States Trade Representative, with the rank of Ambassador
Director of the Office of Management and Budget
 Director of National Drug Control Policy, Office of National Drug Control Policy

Independent agencies 
Commissioner of Social Security, Social Security Administration
Chair of the Federal Reserve
Director of National Intelligence
 Former United States Presidents

Level II
 lists positions given the rank of executive schedule II.  Deputy secretaries of cabinet-level agencies usually have this rank. Since January 2022, the annual rate of pay for Level II is $203,700. While not listed, the deputy secretary of commerce is also at Level II of the Executive Schedule.  The 53 positions are:

Department deputy secretaries
Deputy Secretary of Agriculture
Deputy Secretary of Defense
Deputy Secretary of Education
Deputy Secretary of Energy
Deputy Secretary of Health and Human Services
Deputy Secretary of Homeland Security
Deputy Secretary of Housing and Urban Development
Deputy Secretary of the Interior
Deputy Attorney General
Deputy Secretary of Labor
Deputy Secretary of State
Deputy Secretary of State for Management and Resources
Deputy Secretary of Transportation
Deputy Secretary of the Treasury
Deputy Secretary of Veterans Affairs

Other department officials 
Defense

Secretary of the Army
Secretary of the Navy
Secretary of the Air Force
Under Secretary of Defense for Research and Engineering

Homeland Security

Under Secretary of Homeland Security for Management
Administrator of the Federal Emergency Management Agency
Administrator of the Transportation Security Administration

Transportation

Under Secretary of Transportation for Policy
Administrator of the Federal Aviation Administration
Administrator of the Federal Highway Administration
Administrator of the Federal Transit Administration

Executive Office of the President 

Chair of the Council of Economic Advisers
Director of the Office of Science and Technology Policy
Deputy Director of the Office of National Drug Control Policy
Deputy Director of the Office of Management and Budget
Deputy Director for Management of the Office of Management and Budget and Federal Chief Performance Officer

Independent agencies 
Intelligence Community

Principal Deputy Director of National Intelligence
Director of the National Counterterrorism Center
Director of the Central Intelligence Agency

Other independent agencies

Administrator of the National Aeronautics and Space Administration
Administrator of the United States Agency for International Development
Director of the United States Office of Personnel Management
Administrator of the Environmental Protection Agency
Director of the Federal Housing Finance Agency
Deputy Commissioner of the Social Security Administration
Chief Executive Officer of the Millennium Challenge Corporation
Chair of the Nuclear Regulatory Commission
Director of the National Science Foundation
Director of the Bureau of Consumer Financial Protection
Librarian of Congress
Vice Chair of the Board of Governors of the Federal Reserve System
Vice Chair for Supervision of the Board of Governors of the Federal Reserve System
Members of the Board of Governors of the Federal Reserve System (4)

Level III
 lists 125 positions granted the rank of level III.  Since January 2022, the annual rate of pay for Level III is $187,300. The positions are:

Department under secretaries

Under Secretary of Agriculture for Food, Nutrition, and Consumer Services
Under Secretary of Agriculture for Natural Resources and Environment
Under Secretary of Agriculture for Research, Education and Economics and Chief Scientist
Under Secretary of Agriculture for Food Safety
Under Secretary of Agriculture for Marketing and Regulatory Programs
Under Secretary of Agriculture for Farm Production and Conservation
Under Secretary of Agriculture for Rural Development
Under Secretary of Commerce for International Trade
Under Secretary of Commerce for Economic Affairs
Under Secretary of Commerce for Industry and Security
Under Secretary of Commerce for Oceans and Atmosphere and Administrator of the National Oceanic and Atmospheric Administration
Under Secretary of Commerce for Intellectual Property and Director of the United States Patent and Trademark Office
Under Secretary of Commerce for Standards and Technology and Director of the National Institute of Standards and Technology
Under Secretary of Defense for Acquisition and Sustainment
Under Secretary of Defense for Policy
Under Secretary of Defense (Comptroller)/Chief Financial Officer of the Department of Defense
Under Secretary of Defense for Personnel and Readiness
Under Secretary of Defense for Intelligence and Security
Under Secretary of the Air Force
Under Secretary of the Army
Under Secretary of the Navy
Under Secretary of Education
Under Secretary of Energy
Under Secretary of Energy for Science and Energy
Under Secretary of Energy for Nuclear Security/Administrator of the National Nuclear Security Administration
Under Secretary of Homeland Security for Strategy, Policy, and Plans
Under Secretary of Homeland Security for Science and Technology
Under Secretary of Homeland Security for Intelligence and Analysis and Chief Intelligence Officer of the Department of Homeland Security
Associate Attorney General
Solicitor General
Under Secretary of State for Political Affairs
Under Secretary of State for Management
Under Secretary of State for Economic Growth, Energy, and the Environment
Under Secretary of State for Arms Control and International Security
Under Secretary of State for Public Diplomacy and Public Affairs
Under Secretary of State for Civilian Security, Democracy, and Human Rights
Under Secretary of the Treasury for Domestic Finance
Under Secretary of the Treasury for International Affairs
Under Secretary of the Treasury for Terrorism and Financial Intelligence
Under Secretary of Veterans Affairs for Health
Under Secretary of Veterans Affairs for Benefits
Under Secretary of Veterans Affairs for Memorial Affairs

Other department officials 
Department of Health and Human Services

Administrator, Centers for Medicare and Medicaid Services

Department of Homeland Security

Director of United States Citizenship and Immigration Services
Commissioner of United States Customs and Border Protection
Deputy Administrator of the Federal Emergency Management Agency
Deputy Administrator for Resilience of the Federal Emergency Management Agency

Department of Justice

Director, Federal Bureau of Investigation
Administrator, Drug Enforcement Administration

Department of Transportation

Administrator, National Highway Traffic Safety Administration
Administrator, Federal Motor Carrier Safety Administration
Administrator, Federal Railroad Administration
Administrator, United States Maritime Administration
Administrator, Pipeline and Hazardous Materials Safety Administration

Department of the Treasury

Comptroller of the Currency
Commissioner of Internal Revenue
Director of the Office of Financial Research
Independent Member with Insurance Expertise of the Financial Stability Oversight Council

Note: The Director of the Office of Thrift Supervision was level III before that office was abolished by the Dodd-Frank Act of 2010.

Executive Office of the President 

Three deputy trade representatives within the Office of the United States Trade Representative, currently:
Deputy United States Trade Representative for Europe, The Middle East, and Industrial Competitiveness, with the rank of Ambassador, in Washington, D.C.
Deputy United States Trade Representative for Investment, Services, Labor, Environment, Africa, China, and the Western Hemisphere, with the rank of Ambassador, in Washington, D.C.
Deputy United States Trade Representative and Permanent Representative of the United States of America to the World Trade Organization in Geneva, Switzerland
Chief Agricultural Negotiator, with the rank of Ambassador, Office of the United States Trade Representative
Chief Innovation and Intellectual Property Negotiator, with the rank of Ambassador, Office of the United States Trade Representative
Administrator for Federal Procurement Policy
Administrator, Office of Information and Regulatory Affairs, Office of Management and Budget
Administrator of the Office of Electronic Government and Federal Chief Information Officer of the United States
Controller of the  Office of Federal Financial Management, Office of Management and Budget
Deputy Director for Demand Reduction, Office of National Drug Control Policy
Deputy Director for Supply Reduction, Office of National Drug Control Policy
Deputy Director for State, Local, and Tribal Affairs, Office of National Drug Control Policy
Executive Secretary, National Space Council

Independent agencies 
Directors

Administrator, General Services Administration
Administrator, Small Business Administration
Director, Peace Corps
Chairman and president of the Export-Import Bank of the United States
Director, Federal Mediation and Conciliation Service
Chairman of the Board and Chief Executive Officer of the Farm Credit Administration
Archivist of the United States
Executive Director, Federal Retirement Thrift Investment Board
Director of the United States Trade and Development Agency
Director, Office of Government Ethics
Register of Copyrights
Director, Pension Benefit Guaranty Corporation.
Director of the Congressional Research Service

Deputy directors

Deputy Director of the Central Intelligence Agency
Deputy Administrator, National Aeronautics and Space Administration
Deputy Administrator, United States Agency for International Development
Deputy Director, National Science Foundation
Deputy Director, Office of Personnel Management
Deputy Administrator, Environmental Protection Agency
Deputy Librarian of Congress

Boards and commissions

Chairman, Merit Systems Protection Board
Chairwoman, Federal Communications Commission
Chairman, Board of Directors, Federal Deposit Insurance Corporation
Chairman, Federal Energy Regulatory Commission
Chairman, Federal Trade Commission
Chairman, Surface Transportation Board
Chairman, National Labor Relations Board
Chairman, Securities and Exchange Commission
Chairman, National Mediation Board
Chairman, Railroad Retirement Board
Chairman, Federal Maritime Commission
Chairman, National Transportation Safety Board
Chairman, National Endowment for the Arts
Chairman, National Endowment for the Humanities
Chairman, Postal Regulatory Commission
Chairman, Occupational Safety and Health Review Commission
Chairman, Equal Employment Opportunity Commission
Chairman, Consumer Product Safety Commission
Chairman, Commodity Futures Trading Commission
Chairman, United States International Trade Commission
Chairman, Federal Mine Safety and Health Review Commission
Chairman, National Credit Union Administration Board
Defense Nuclear Facilities Safety Board - (1) Chairman; (2) Vice Chairman; (3) Member; (4) Member; (5) Member
Nuclear Regulatory Commission - Four Commissioners

Obsolete positions

Director of the Office of Emergency Planning
Chairman, Federal Housing Finance Board

Level IV
 lists 346 non-obsolete positions with the rank of executive schedule level IV.  Since January 2022, the annual rate of pay for Level IV is $176,300. The positions are:

Department assistant secretaries 

Assistant Secretary of Agriculture for Administration
Assistant Secretary of Agriculture for Civil Rights
Assistant Secretary of Agriculture for Congressional Relations
Chief Financial Officer and Assistant Secretary of Commerce for Administration
Assistant Secretary of Commerce for Legislative and Intergovernmental Affairs
Assistant Secretary of Commerce for Communications and Information and Administrator of the National Telecommunications and Information Administration
Assistant Secretary of Commerce for Export Enforcement
Assistant Secretary of Commerce for Export Administration
Assistant Secretary of Commerce for Economic Development
Assistant Secretary of Commerce for Enforcement and Compliance
Assistant Secretary of Commerce for Industry and Analysis
Assistant Secretary of Commerce for Oceans and Atmosphere and Deputy Administrator of the National Oceanic and Atmospheric Administration
Assistant Secretary of Commerce for Environmental Observation and Prediction
Director General of the United States and Foreign Commercial Service and Assistant Secretary of Commerce for Global Markets
Assistant Secretaries of Defense (9)
Assistant Secretaries of the Air Force (5)
Assistant Secretaries of the Army (5)
Assistant Secretaries of the Navy (4)
Assistant Secretaries of Education (10)
Assistant Secretaries of Energy (6)
Assistant Secretaries of Health and Human Services (6)
Assistant Secretaries of the Department of Homeland Security
Assistant Secretaries of Housing and Urban Development (8)
Assistant Secretaries of the Interior (6)
Assistant Attorneys General (10)
Assistant Secretaries of Labor (10), one of whom shall be the Assistant Secretary of Labor for Veterans' Employment and Training
Assistant Secretary of Labor for Mine Safety and Health
Assistant Secretaries of State (24) and four other Department of State officials to be appointed by the president, by and with the advice and consent of the United States Senate
Assistant Secretaries of Transportation (4)
Assistant Secretaries of the Treasury (8)
Deputy Under Secretaries of the Treasury (or Assistant Secretaries of the Treasury) (2)
 Assistant Secretaries of Veterans Affairs (7)

General counsels 

General Counsel of the Department of Agriculture
General Counsel of the Department of Commerce
General Counsel of the Department of Defense
General Counsel of the Department of the Army
General Counsel of the Department of the Navy
General Counsel of the Department of the Air Force
General Counsel of the Department of Education
General Counsel of the Department of Energy
General Counsel of the Department of Health and Human Services
General Counsel of the Department of Homeland Security
General Counsel of the Department of Housing and Urban Development
Solicitor of the Department of the Interior
Solicitor of Labor
General Counsel of the Department of Transportation
General Counsel of the Department of the Treasury
General Counsel of the Department of Veterans Affairs
General Counsel of the Central Intelligence Agency
General Counsel of the Office of the Director of the National Intelligence
General Counsel of the National Labor Relations Board
Special Counsel of the Merit Systems Protection Board
Chief Counsel for Advocacy, Small Business Administration

Inspectors general 

Inspector General of the Department of Agriculture
Inspector General of the Department of Commerce
Inspector General of the Department of Defense
Inspector General of the Department of Education
Inspector General of the Department of Energy
Inspector General of the Department of Health and Human Services
Inspector General of the Department of Homeland Security
Inspector General, Federal Emergency Management Agency
Inspector General of the Department of Housing and Urban Development
Inspector General of the Department of the Interior
Inspector General of the Department of Justice
Inspector General of the Department of Labor
Inspector General of the Department of State
Inspector General of the Department of Transportation
Inspector General of the Department of the Treasury
Inspector General of the Department of Veterans Affairs
Inspector General of the National Aeronautics and Space Administration
Inspector General, United States Environmental Protection Agency
Inspector General, Export-Import Bank
Inspector General, General Services Administration
Inspector General, Nuclear Regulatory Commission
Inspector General, Office of Personnel Management
Inspector General, Railroad Retirement Board
Inspector General, Small Business Administration
Inspector General, Tennessee Valley Authority
Inspector General, Federal Deposit Insurance Corporation
Inspector General, Resolution Trust Corporation
Inspector General, Central Intelligence Agency
Inspector General, Social Security Administration
Inspector General, United States Postal Service

Chief financial officers 

Chief Financial Officer of the Department of Agriculture
Chief Financial Officer of the Department of Commerce
Chief Financial Officer of the Department of Education
Chief Financial Officer of the Department of Energy
Chief Financial Officer of the Department of Health and Human Services
Chief Financial Officer of the Department of Homeland Security
Chief Financial Officer of the Department of Housing and Urban Development
Chief Financial Officer of the Department of the Interior
Chief Financial Officer of the Department of Justice
Chief Financial Officer of the Department of Labor
Chief Financial Officer of the Department of State
Chief Financial Officer of the Department of Transportation
Chief Financial Officer of the Department of the Treasury
Chief Financial Officer of the Department of Veterans Affairs
Chief Financial Officer of the National Aeronautics and Space Administration
Chief Financial Officer, United States Environmental Protection Agency

Chief information officers 

Chief Information Officer of the Department of Agriculture
Chief Information Officer of the Department of Commerce
Chief Information Officer, Department of Defense (unless the official designated is listed under section 5312, 5313, or 5314 of this title)
Chief Information Officer of the Department of Education
Chief Information Officer of the Department of Energy
Chief Information Officer of the Department of Health and Human Services
Chief Information Officer of the Department of Homeland Security
Chief Information Officer, Federal Emergency Management Agency
Chief Information Officer of the Department of Housing and Urban Development
Chief Information Officer of the Department of the Interior
Chief Information Officer of the Department of Justice
Chief Information Officer of the Department of Labor
Chief Information Officer of the Department of State
Chief Information Officer of the Department of Transportation
Chief Information Officer of the Department of the Treasury
Chief Information Officer of the Department of Veterans Affairs
Chief Information Officer of the National Aeronautics and Space Administration
Chief Information Officer of the United States Agency for International Development
Chief Information Officer, United States Environmental Protection Agency
Chief Information Officer, General Services Administration
Chief Information Officer, National Science Foundation
Chief Information Officer, Nuclear Regulatory Agency
Chief Information Officer, Office of Personnel Management
Chief Information Officer, Small Business Administration

Other department officials 
Department of Agriculture

Administrator of the Rural Utilities Service

Department of Commerce

Director of the Bureau of the Census
Deputy Under Secretary of Commerce for Intellectual Property and Deputy Director of the United States Patent and Trademark Office

Department of Defense

Director of Civil Defense, Department of the Army
Director, Operational Test and Evaluation
Director of Defense Research and Engineering
Deputy Under Secretary of Defense for Policy
Deputy Under Secretary of Defense for Personnel and Readiness

Department of Education

Liaison for Community and Junior Colleges
Director of the Office of Educational Technology
Commissioner, National Center for Education Statistics

Department of Energy

Administrator, Energy Information Administration
Director, Office of Science
Principal Deputy Administrator, National Nuclear Security Administration
Additional deputy administrators of the National Nuclear Security Administration (3) (two if the Deputy Administrator for Naval Reactors is a United States Navy officer on active duty)

Department of Health and Human Services

Commissioner of Food and Drugs

Department of Homeland Security

Officer for Civil Rights and Civil Liberties
Federal Insurance Administrator, Federal Emergency Management Agency

Department of Housing and Urban Development

President, Government National Mortgage Association

Department of Justice

Director, Community Relations Service
Director, Bureau of Prisons
Director of the National Institute of Justice
Director of the Bureau of Justice Statistics
Administrator, Office of Juvenile Justice and Delinquency Prevention
Director of the United States Marshals Service
Deputy Director of the Federal Bureau of Investigation

Department of Labor

Administrator of the Wage & Hour Division
Commissioner of Labor Statistics

Department of State

Special Representatives of the President for arms control, nonproliferation, and disarmament matters, Department of State
Ambassadors at large

Department of Transportation

Administrator of the Saint Lawrence Seaway Development Corporation
Deputy Administrator, Federal Aviation Administration
Deputy Federal Highway Administrator

Other independent agency officials 
United States Agency for International Development

Assistant Administrator for the Bureau for Democracy, Conflict and Humanitarian Assistance
Assistant Administrator for the Bureau for Economic Growth, Education and Environment
Assistant Administrator for the Bureau for Global Health
Assistant Administrator for the Bureau for Legislative and Public Affairs
Assistant Administrator for the Bureau for Management
Assistant Administrator for the Bureau for Africa
Assistant Administrator for the Bureau for Asia
Assistant Administrator for the Bureau for Europe and Eurasia
Assistant Administrator for the Bureau for Latin America and the Caribbean
Assistant Administrator for the Bureau for the Middle East

Other independent agencies

Director of Selective Service
President, National Consumer Cooperative Bank
Director of the Institute of Museum and Library Services
Commissioner, Office of Navajo and Hopi Indian Relocation
Director of the International Broadcasting Bureau
Deputy Administrator of General Services
 Deputy Administrator, Small Business Administration
Deputy Director of the Peace Corps
First Vice President of the Export-Import Bank of the United States
Assistant Secretary for Science, Smithsonian Institution
Assistant Secretary for History and Art, Smithsonian Institution
Executive Vice President, Overseas Private Investment Corporation
Director of Nuclear Reactor Regulation, Nuclear Regulatory Commission
Director of Nuclear Material Safety and Safeguards, Nuclear Regulatory Commission
Director of Nuclear Regulatory Research, Nuclear Regulatory Commission
Executive Director for Operations, Nuclear Regulatory Commission
Deputy Director, Institute for Scientific and Technological Cooperation
Assistant Administrator for Toxic Substances, United States Environmental Protection Agency
Assistant Administrator, Office of Solid Waste, United States Environmental Protection Agency
Assistant Administrators, United States Environmental Protection Agency (8)
Associate Administrator of the National Aeronautics and Space Administration

Executive Office of the President 

Deputy Director of the Office of Science and Technology
Assistant Directors of the Office of Management and Budget (3)
Members, Council of Economic Advisers

Boards and commissions

Chairman, Federal Labor Relations Authority
Chairman, Board of Veterans' Appeals
Chairman, United States Parole Commission
Members, United States International Trade Commission (5)
Members, Board of Directors of the Export-Import Bank of the United States
Members, Federal Communications Commission
Member, Board of Directors of the Federal Deposit Insurance Corporation
Directors, Federal Housing Finance Board
Members, Federal Energy Regulatory Commission
Members, Federal Trade Commission
Members, Surface Transportation Board
Members, National Labor Relations Board
Members, Securities and Exchange Commission
Members, Merit Systems Protection Board
Members, Federal Maritime Commission
Members, National Mediation Board
Members, Railroad Retirement Board
Members, Equal Employment Opportunity Commission (4)
Members, National Transportation Safety Board
Members, National Credit Union Administration Board (2)
Members, Postal Regulatory Commission (4)
Members, Occupational Safety and Health Review Commission
Members, Consumer Product Safety Commission (4)
Members, Commodity Futures Trading Commission
Members, Federal Mine Safety and Health Review Commission

Obsolete positions

Deputy Director of the Office of Emergency Planning
Commissioner of Interamal

Level V
 lists the 143 positions that receive the amount of pay determined by Chapter 11 of Title 2.  Since January 2022, the annual rate of pay for Level V is $165,300. The positions are as follows:

Agency directors 

Director, United States Travel Service, Department of Commerce
National Export Expansion Coordinator, Department of Commerce
Director, Defense Advanced Research Projects Agency, Department of Defense
Administrator, Bonneville Power Administration, Department of Energy
Chairman, Foreign Claims Settlement Commission of the United States, Department of Justice
Commissioner of Vocational Rehabilitation, Department of Health and Human Services
Commissioner of Welfare, Department of Health and Human Services
Commissioner, Administration for Children and Families
Director, Indian Health Service, Department of Health and Human Services
Director, United States Fish and Wildlife Service, Department of the Interior
Director, United States Bureau of Mines, Department of the Interior
Director, United States Geological Survey, Department of the Interior
Commissioner of Reclamation, Department of the Interior
Commissioner of Indian Affairs, Department of the Interior
Director, Bureau of Land Management, Department of the Interior
Director, National Park Service, Department of the Interior
Director, Bureau of Narcotics and Dangerous Drugs, Department of Justice
Administrator, Wage and Hour and Public Contracts Division, Department of Labor
Administrator, National Capital Transportation Agency
Archivist of the United States
Chairman of the Federal Renegotiation Board
Chairman of the Subversive Activities Control Board
Commissioner, Federal Supply Service, General Services Administration
Commissioner, Public Buildings Service, General Services Administration
Commissioners, Indian Claims Commission (5)
Staff Director, Commission on Civil Rights
Director, United States National Museum, Smithsonian Institution
Director, Smithsonian Astrophysical Observatory, Smithsonian Institution
Administrator, Environmental Science Services Administration
Executive Director, Advisory Council on Historic Preservation
Commissioners, United States Parole Commission (4)

Other officials 

Associate Administrators, Small Business Administration (4)
Associate Administrators, National Aeronautics and Space Administration (7)
Associate Deputy Administrator, National Aeronautics and Space Administration
Deputy Associate Administrator, National Aeronautics and Space Administration
Assistant Attorney General for Administration
Assistant and Science Adviser to the Secretary of the Interior
Assistant to the Secretary of Defense for Nuclear & Chemical & Biological Defense Programs, Department of Defense
Chief Counsel for the Internal Revenue Service, Department of the Treasury
Deputy Commissioner of Internal Revenue, Department of the Treasury
Deputy General Counsel, Department of Defense
Associate Director of the Federal Mediation and Conciliation Service
Associate Director for Volunteers, Peace Corps
Associate Director for Program Development and Operations, Peace Corps
Assistants to the Director of the Federal Bureau of Investigation, Department of Justice (2)
Assistant Directors, Office of Emergency Planning (3)
Fiscal Assistant Secretary of the Treasury
General Counsel of the Agency for International Development
General Counsel of the Nuclear Regulatory Commission
General Counsel of the National Aeronautics and Space Administration
Manpower Administrator, Department of Labor
Members, Federal Renegotiation Board
Members, Subversive Activities Control Board
Deputy Under Secretaries of Defense for Research and Engineering, Department of Defense (4)
Assistant Administrator of General Services
Assistant Director (Program Planning, Analysis and Research), Office of Economic Opportunity
Deputy Director, National Security Agency
Special Assistant to the Secretary of Defense
Assistant Secretary for Administration, Department of Transportation
Associate Directors, Office of Personnel Management (5)
Assistant Federal Highway Administrator
Deputy Administrator, National Highway Traffic Safety Administration
Deputy Administrator, Federal Motor Carrier Safety Administration
Assistant Administrator, Federal Motor Carrier Safety Administration
Vice Presidents, Overseas Private Investment Corporation (3)
Deputy Administrator, Federal Transit Administration, Department of Transportation
General Counsel, Equal Employment Opportunity Commission
Additional officers, Department of Energy (14)
Additional officers, Nuclear Regulatory Commission (5)
Assistant Administrator for Coastal Zone Management, National Oceanic and Atmospheric Administration
Assistant Administrator for Fisheries, National Oceanic and Atmospheric Administration
Assistant Administrators, National Oceanic and Atmospheric Administration (3)
General Counsel, National Oceanic and Atmospheric Administration
Members, Federal Labor Relations Authority (2)
General Counsel, Federal Labor Relations Authority
Additional officers, Institute for Scientific and Technological Cooperation (2)
Additional officers, Office of Management and Budget (6)
Associate Deputy Secretary, Department of Transportation
Chief Scientist, National Oceanic and Atmospheric Administration
Deputy Administrator, Drug Enforcement Administration (DEA), Department of Justice

Presidential authority to place positions at levels IV and V
Per , the president can at any time appoint no more than 34 individuals to pay rates Level IV and V, provided that they are viewed as a necessary change to organization, management responsibility, or workload within a specific agency. This figure is in addition to Level IV and V positions specifically authorized in the bill. However, Senate consent is required and the pay rate takes effect only upon a new appointment to that position.  All actions taken during this process are to be published in the Federal Register, except when it is deemed that such publication would stand in conflict to national security.  The president may not take action under this section with respect to a position, the pay for which is fixed at a specific rate by this subchapter, or by statute enacted after 14 August 1964.

The following positions are granted Level IV pay status of the Executive Schedule:

Counselor to the Secretary, United States Department of the Treasury
Deputy Under Secretary for International Labor Affairs, United States Department of Labor
Administrator of the Substance Abuse and Mental Health Services Administration
Executive Secretary of the National Security Council
Administrator of the Office of Juvenile Justice and Delinquency Prevention
Assistant Secretary of the Air Force
Director of the Office for Victims of Crime
Director of the Bureau of Justice Assistance
Director of the National Institutes of Health
Members of the Chemical Safety and Hazard Investigation Board (5)
Commissioner on Aging (now Assistant Secretary for Aging, Department of Health and Human Services)

The following positions are granted Level V pay status:

Deputy Assistant Secretary of Defense for Reserve Affairs, Department of Defense
Counselor to the Secretary of Labor, Department of Labor
Deputy Under Secretary for Education, Department of Education
Commissioner of the Administration for Native Americans

References

External links

Reorganization Plan No. 2 of 1973 - Appendix to Title 5, U.S. Code

Civil service in the United States
Federal government of the United States
United States federal budgets
Employee compensation in the United States